Elodie Kuijper (born 2 March 2000) is a Dutch professional racing cyclist, who rode for the UCI Women's Team .

References

External links

2000 births
Living people
Dutch female cyclists
Place of birth missing (living people)
21st-century Dutch women